Akboğa is a village in the Maden District of Elazığ Province in Turkey. Its population is 69 (2021).

References

Villages in Maden District